Paradise Lake is an alpine lake in Camas County, Idaho, United States, located in the Smoky Mountains in the Sawtooth National Forest. While no trails lead directly to the lake, it is most easily accessed via trail 070. The lake is located just south of Paradise Peak.

References

Lakes of Idaho
Lakes of Camas County, Idaho
Glacial lakes of the United States
Glacial lakes of the Sawtooth National Forest